Anaulacodithella is a genus of pseudoscorpions in the family Tridenchthoniidae. There are about seven described species in Anaulacodithella.

Species
These seven species belong to the genus Anaulacodithella:
 Anaulacodithella angustimana Beier, 1955
 Anaulacodithella australica Beier, 1969
 Anaulacodithella deserticola (Beier, 1944)
 Anaulacodithella mordax (Tullgren, 1907)
 Anaulacodithella novacaledonica Beier, 1966
 Anaulacodithella plurisetosa Beier, 1976
 Anaulacodithella reticulata Beier, 1966

References

Further reading

External links

 

Tridenchthoniidae
Pseudoscorpion genera